İğciler may refer to the following villages in Turkey:

 İğciler, Bigadiç
 İğciler, Polatlı